This is a list of National Basketball Association players whose last names begin with S. 

The list also includes players from the American National Basketball League (NBL), the Basketball Association of America (BAA), and the original American Basketball Association (ABA). All of these leagues contributed to the formation of the present-day NBA.

Individuals who played in the NBL prior to its 1949 merger with the BAA are listed in italics, as they are not traditionally listed in the NBA's official player registers.

S

Frank Sabo
Arvydas Sabonis
Domantas Sabonis
Ed Sachs
Frank Sachse
Leo Sack
Robert Sacre
Ed Sadowski (b. 1917)
Eddie Sadowski (b. 1915)
Junior Saffer
Ken Sailors
John Salley
John Salmons
Al Salvadori
Kevin Salvadori
Soumaila Samake
Luka Šamanić
Cheikh Samb
Brandon Sampson
JaKarr Sampson
Jamal Sampson
Ralph Sampson
Samardo Samuels
Pepe Sanchez
Al Sanders
Frankie Sanders
Jeff Sanders
Larry Sanders
Melvin Sanders
Mike Sanders
Satch Sanders
Ron Sanford
Daniel Santiago
Bob Santini
Wayne Sappleton
Dario Šarić
Olivier Sarr
Jason Sasser
Jeryl Sasser
Kenny Satterfield
Bill Sattler
Louie Sauer
Frank Saul
Woody Sauldsberry
Glynn Saulters
Fred Saunders
Rusty Saunders
Don Savage
Predrag Savović
Alan Sawyer
Brian Scalabrine
Alex Scales
DeWayne Scales
Ted Scalissi
Jack Scarry
Frank Schade
Ben Schadler
Herm Schaefer
Billy Schaeffer
Bob Schafer
Jordan Schakel
Bennie Schall
Ben Scharnus
Marv Schatzman
Fred Schaus
Danny Schayes
Dolph Schayes
Ossie Schectman
Herb Scheffler
Steve Scheffler
Tom Scheffler
Ed Scheiwe
Dave Schellhase
Luke Schenscher
Herb Scherer
John Schick
Dwayne Schintzius
Glenn Schlechty
Dale Schlueter
Otto Schnellbacher
Dick Schnittker
Russ Schoene
Admiral Schofield
Dave Scholz
Gene Scholz
Milt Schoon
Bill Schrader
Warren Schrage
Al Schrecker
Detlef Schrempf
Bill Schroeder
Dennis Schröder
Wilbur Schu
Herm Schuessler
Howie Schultz
Dick Schulz
Wilbur Schumacher
Roger Schurig
Bob Schwartz
John Schweitz
Luis Scola
Fred Scolari
Alvin Scott
Brent Scott
Byron Scott
Charlie Scott
Dennis Scott
James Scott
Joe Scott
Mike Scott
Ray Scott
Shawnelle Scott
Trevon Scott
Willie Scott
Paul Scranton
Jay Scrubb
Carey Scurry
Dereon Seabron
Bruce Seals
Shea Seals
Malik Sealy
Tom Sealy
Ed Searcy
Ken Sears
Johnny Sebastian
Wayne See
Thabo Sefolosha
Rony Seikaly
Glen Selbo
Josh Selby
Wayne Selden Jr.
Brad Sellers
Phil Sellers
Rollie Seltz
Les Selvage
Frank Selvy
Jim Seminoff
Mouhamed Sene
George Senesky
Alperen Şengün
Kevin Séraphin
Ansu Sesay
Ramon Sessions
Tom Sewell
Collin Sexton
Paul Seymour
Nick Shaback
Lynn Shackelford
Charles Shackleford
Bob Shaddock
Carl Shaeffer
Jack Shaffer
Lee Shaffer
Mustafa Shakur
Frank Shamel
Landry Shamet
God Shammgod
Chuck Shanklin
Earl Shannon
Frank Shannon
Howie Shannon
Chuck Share
Steve Sharkey
Bill Sharman
Day'Ron Sharpe
Shaedon Sharpe
Walter Sharpe
John Shasky
Ronnie Shavlik
Bob Shaw
Brian Shaw
Casey Shaw
Marial Shayok
Bob Shea
Fred Sheffield
Craig Shelton
Lonnie Shelton
Tornike Shengelia
Billy Shepherd
Jeff Sheppard
Steve Sheppard
Edmund Sherod
Charley Shipp
Paul Shirley
Ollie Shoaff
Gene Short
Purvis Short
Slim Shoun
Dexter Shouse
Dick Shrider
Gene Shue
John Shumate
Iman Shumpert
Alexey Shved
Pascal Siakam
Jordan Sibert
Sam Sibert
Mark Sibley
Jerry Sichting
Don Sidle
Vic Siegel
Larry Siegfried
Ralph Siewert
Jack Sikma
James Silas
Paul Silas
Xavier Silas
Garret Siler
Mike Silliman
Chris Silva
Marcos Louzada Silva
Wayne Simien
Ben Simmons
Bobby Simmons
Cedric Simmons
Connie Simmons
Grant Simmons
John Simmons
Jonathon Simmons
Kobi Simmons
Lionel Simmons
Miles Simon
Walt Simon
Marko Simonović
Anfernee Simons
Dickey Simpkins
Ralph Simpson
Zavier Simpson
Alvin Sims
Bob Sims (b. 1915)
Bob Sims (b. 1938)
Courtney Sims
Doug Sims
Henry Sims
Jericho Sims
Scott Sims
John Sines
Kyle Singler
Sean Singletary
Chris Singleton
James Singleton
McKinley Singleton
Zeke Sinicola
Deividas Sirvydis
Steve Sitko
Charlie Sitton
Peyton Siva
Bob Skarda
Scott Skiles
Al Skinner
Brian Skinner
Talvin Skinner
Myer Skoog
Pres Slack
Jeff Slade
Reggie Slater
Jim Slaughter
Jose Slaughter
Tamar Slay
Donald Sloan
Jerry Sloan
Uroš Slokar
Tom Sluby
Alen Smailagić
Javonte Smart
Keith Smart
Marcus Smart
Belus Smawley
Danny Smick
Jack Smiley
Adrian Smith
Al Smith
Bill Smith
Bingo Smith
Bobby Smith
Charles Smith (b. 1965)
Charles Smith (b. 1967)
Charles Smith (b. 1975)
Chris Smith (b. 1970)
Chris Smith (b. 1987)
Clinton Smith
Craig Smith
Deb Smith
Dennis Smith Jr.
Derek Smith
Don Smith (b. 1910)
Don Smith (b. 1920)
Don Smith (b. 1951)
Donta Smith
Doug Smith
Dru Smith
Ed Smith
Elmore Smith
Garfield Smith
Greg Smith (b. 1947)
Greg Smith (b. 1991)
Ish Smith
J. R. Smith
Jabari Smith
Jabari Smith Jr.
Jalen Smith
Jason Smith
Jerry Smith
Jim Smith
Joe Smith
John Smith
Josh Smith
Keith Smith
Ken Smith
Kenny Smith
LaBradford Smith
Larry Smith
Leon Smith
Michael Smith (b. 1965)
Michael Smith (b. 1972)
Mike Smith
Nolan Smith
Otis Smith
Pete Smith
Phil Smith
Randy Smith
Reggie Smith
Robert Smith
Russ Smith
Sam Smith (b. 1944)
Sam Smith (b. 1955)
Steve Smith
Steven Smith
Stevin Smith
Theron Smith
Tony Smith
Wee Willie Smith
William Smith
Willie Smith
Zhaire Smith
Rik Smits
Mike Smrek
Joe Smyth
Xavier Sneed
Tony Snell
Eric Snow
Bello Snyder
Dick Snyder
Kirk Snyder
Chips Sobek
Ricky Sobers
Ron Sobieszczyk
Jeremy Sochan
Mike Sojourner
Willie Sojourner
Paul Sokody
Will Solomon
Willie Somerset
Darius Songaila
Harry Sorenson
Dave Sorenson
Joe Sotak
James Southerland
Gino Sovran
Pape Sow
Ken Spain
Ray Spalding
Jim Spanarkel
Vassilis Spanoulis
Dan Sparks
Guy Sparrow
Rory Sparrow
Odie Spears
Art Spector
Marreese Speights
Omari Spellman
Andre Spencer
Elmore Spencer
Felton Spencer
Jack Spencer
Lou Spicer
Craig Spitzer
Tiago Splitter
Art Spoelstra
Edward Spotovich
Bruce Spraggins
Latrell Sprewell
Larry Spriggs
Jaden Springer
Jim Springer
Jim Spruill
Joe Spudic
Joe Stack
Ryan Stack
Jerry Stackhouse
Kevin Stacom
Erv Staggs
Bud Stallworth
Dave Stallworth
Howard Stammler
Joseph Stampf
Ed Stanczak
Walt Stanky
Cassius Stanley
Terence Stansbury
Jack Stanton
Clovis Stark
John Starks
Keith Starr
Dick Starzyk
Nik Stauskas
Larry Staverman
Larry Steele
Ed Stege
Matt Steigenga
Jerry Steiner
Vladimir Stepania
John Stephans
Ben Stephens
D. J. Stephens
Everette Stephens
Jack Stephens
Joe Stephens
Lance Stephenson
Alex Stepheson
Brook Steppe
Barry Stevens
Lamar Stevens
Wayne Stevens
DeShawn Stevenson
Dennis Stewart
Isaiah Stewart
Kebu Stewart
Larry Stewart
Michael Stewart
Norm Stewart
Greg Stiemsma
Steve Stipanovich
Jack Stirling
Bryant Stith
Sam Stith
Tom Stith
Alex Stivrins
David Stockton
John Stockton
Art Stoefen
Peja Stojaković
Ed Stokes
Greg Stokes
Jarnell Stokes
Maurice Stokes
Art Stolkey
Randy Stoll
Diamond Stone
George Stone
Julyan Stone
Awvee Storey
Damon Stoudamire
Salim Stoudamire
Amar'e Stoudemire
Marvin Stout
Paul Stovall
Dave Strack
Ted Strain
Reno Strand
D. J. Strawberry
Joe Strawder
Bill Stricker
Erick Strickland
Mark Strickland
Rod Strickland
Roger Strickland
John Stroeder
Derek Strong
Ted Strong
Lamont Strothers
John Stroud
Red Stroud
Chet Strumillo
Max Strus
Rodney Stuckey
Gene Stump
Stanley Stutz
John Styler
Sally Suddith
Kenny Suesens
Jalen Suggs
Gary Suiter
Jared Sullinger
Bob Sullivan
Bill Sumerix
DaJuan Summers
Edmond Sumner
Barry Sumpter
Sun Yue
Don Sunderlage
Bruno Šundov
Jon Sundvold
Bob Sura
Dick Surhoff
George Sutor
Dane Suttle
Greg Sutton
George Svendsen
Keith Swagerty
Bennie Swain
Caleb Swanigan
Everett Swank
Duane Swanson
Hale Swanson
Norm Swanson
Dan Swartz
Michael Sweetney
Cole Swider
Robert Swift
Skeeter Swift
Stromile Swift
Willard Swihart
Aaron Swinson
Craig Sword
Pape Sy
Buck Sydnor
Keifer Sykes
Larry Sykes
Bob Synnott
Brett Szabo
Walt Szczerbiak
Wally Szczerbiak
Stan Szukala

References
  NBA & ABA Players with Last Names Starting with S @ basketball-reference.com
 NBL Players with Last Names Starting with S @ basketball-reference.com

S